Jean Margaret Gordon (1865 – February 24, 1931) was an American suffragist, social worker, civic leader, and reformer. She served as president of the Louisiana Woman Suffrage Association (1913–20). She was New Orleans's first factory inspector. She also served as president of the board and supervisor of the Alexander Milne Home for Girls. After assisting in the establishment of the School of Applied Sociology, she was its lecturer and field supervisor. Born in New Orleans, she was a daughter of George Hume Gordon, schoolmaster, and Margaret (Galiece) Gordon. There were two sisters, Kate and Fanny, as well as two brothers, George H. and William Andrew Gordon.

Selected works
 Child Labor On the Stage (1911)

References

1865 births
1931 deaths
People from New Orleans
American suffragists
American social workers
20th-century American writers
20th-century American women writers